Dantzig is a surname. Notable people with the surname include:

 Tobias Dantzig (1884–1956), mathematician from Lithuania, father of George Dantzig
 George Dantzig (1914–2005), American mathematician who introduced the simplex algorithm
 David van Dantzig (1900–1959), Dutch mathematician
 Rudi van Dantzig (1933–2012), Dutch choreographer, ballet dancer and writer
 Jol Dantzig, American guitar player and designer, founder of Hamer Guitar company

See also 
 Danzig (disambiguation)

Germanic-language surnames
Jewish surnames

ja:ダンチヒ